This is a list of the National Register of Historic Places listings in San Patricio County, Texas.

This is intended to be a complete list of properties listed on the National Register of Historic Places in San Patricio County, Texas. There is one property listed on the National Register in the county. This property is also a Recorded Texas Historic Landmark.

Current listings

The locations of National Register properties may be seen in a mapping service provided.

|}

See also

National Register of Historic Places listings in Texas
Recorded Texas Historic Landmarks in San Patricio County

References

External links

San Patricio County, Texas
San Patricio County
Buildings and structures in San Patricio County, Texas